Alan Geoffrey Phillips (born 27 March 1931) is an English former first-class cricketer.

Phillips was born at Blackburn in March 1931. While studying at Worcester College at the University of Oxford, he made three appearances in first-class cricket for Oxford University against Worcestershire in 1931, followed by matches against Middlesex and Worcestershire in 1954. He scored 71 runs in these three matches, with a high score of 31. In addition to playing first-class cricket, Phillips also played minor counties cricket for Shropshire in 1960, making a single appearance in the Minor Counties Championship.

References

External links

1931 births
Living people
People from Blackburn
Alumni of Worcester College, Oxford
English cricketers
Oxford University cricketers
Shropshire cricketers